Philipo Augustino Mulugo (born 27 January 1972) is a Tanzanian CCM politician and Member of Parliament for Songwe constituency since 2010. He was once served as the Deputy Minister of Education and Vocational Training.

References

1972 births
Living people
Chama Cha Mapinduzi MPs
Tanzanian MPs 2010–2015
Tanzanian MPs 2020–2025
Mbeya Secondary School alumni
Songea Boys Secondary School alumni
Open University of Tanzania alumni